The Brownings may refer to:

 a famous 19th-century literary couple
Robert Browning (1812–1889), English poet and playwright best remembered for The Ring and the Book
Elizabeth Barrett Browning (1806–1861), English poet best remembered for Sonnets from the Portuguese